Norenberg may refer to:

Ińsko, a town in Poland.
Lynn Barry (née Norenberg), a former assistant director of United States women's basketball and former adviser to the Women's National Basketball Association.
Jacob Norenberg, a Norwegian sprint canoer.